Gabungan Sepak Bola Wajo (simply known as Gaswa Wajo) is an Indonesian football club based in Wajo Regency, South Sulawesi. They currently compete in the Liga 3.

References

External links

Sport in South Sulawesi
Football clubs in Indonesia
Football clubs in South Sulawesi
Association football clubs established in 1970
1970 establishments in Indonesia